The Disney Sequoia Lodge is a hotel situated at Disneyland Paris. It was designed by French architect Antoine Grumbach to evoke the atmosphere of the American National Park lodges built around the beginning of the 20th century, such as the Old Faithful Inn (1904) in Yellowstone National Park and others in Yosemite and other Western National Parks.

The main lodge faces across Lake Disney towards the Disney Village and is home to many of the 1011 guest rooms as well as two restaurants (one of which specializes in grilled meat) and a hotel bar. Behind the main lodge are six smaller lodges, five of which contain the remainder of the rooms while the sixth lodge contains the hotel's swimming pool and leisure facilities. Surrounding the hotel are thousands of trees which were imported from the West Coasts of the United States and Canada, among with hundreds of Sequoias.

The hotel opened with the Euro Disney Resort in April 1992. On September 8, 1996, dozens of rooms were damaged by a fire.
 On January 10, 2015, a guest allegedly opened a window and shouted that she was Hayat Boumeddiene, who is wanted in connection with the Charlie Hebdo shooting that took place just three days earlier. The hotel guests were told to stay in their rooms, while other parts of the resort were evacuated and armed police called in. The woman issued a threat; however, it turned out to be a false alarm. She was taken into custody, and the resort resumed normal operations.

On 26 July 2020, Disney rebranded all their onsite hotels by  dropping the possessive apostrophe. This meant the name was changed from Disney's Sequoia Lodge to Disney Sequoia Lodge.

List Of Amusement arcades 
Marvel vs. Capcom: Clash of Super Heroes (1998) (Disney's Sequoia Lodge (2001))

References

Sequoia Lodge
Hotels established in 1992
Hotel buildings completed in 1992